The 2007 Men's South American Volleyball Championship was the 27th edition of the event, organised by South America's governing volleyball body, the Confederación Sudamericana de Voleibol (CSV). It was hosted in Viña del Mar (Polideportivo Sausalito) and Santiago, Chile (Estadio Víctor Jara) from September 5 to September 9, 2007. The winner and the runner-up qualified for the 2007 FIVB Men's World Cup in Japan, later that year.

Teams

Group A – Viña del Mar

Group B – Santiago de Chile

 (Hosts)

Preliminary round

Group A

Wednesday 2007-09-05

Thursday 2007-09-06

Friday 2007-09-07

Group B

Wednesday 2007-09-05

Thursday 2007-09-06

Friday 2007-09-07

Final round

Saturday 2007-09-08

Sunday 2007-09-09

Saturday 2007-09-08

Sunday 2007-09-09

Final ranking

Individual awards

References
 Results
 CSV Results

Men's South American Volleyball Championships
S
Volleyball
V
September 2007 sports events in South America